The Human Rights Commission of Austin (Texas) (hereafter the "Commission") was established on October 5, 1967, by the City of Austin Ordinance 671005-B. The current version of the ordinance can be found at Section 2-1-148 of The Code of the City of Austin, Texas.

The Commission is responsible for securing for all individuals in the city freedom from discrimination because of race, color, disability, religion, sex, national origin, sexual orientation, gender identity, or age. The primary goal of the seven Commission members is to promote and enforce fair treatment of all individuals in the areas of employment, housing, and public accommodations. The Commission has adopted important bylaws to govern its duties and procedures.

General duties 
The Commission advises and consults with the Austin City Council on all matters involving racial, religious, or ethnic discrimination. The Commission also recommends to the council legislation designed to eliminate prejudice and discrimination.

The Commission advises all City of Austin departments, boards, and regulatory agencies to assure effective compliance with non-discrimination policies and orders. The Commission recommends to the Austin city manager ways to improve the ability of city departments and agencies to protect all persons and groups against discrimination. The Commission helps train city employees to use methods that result in respect for equal rights and equal treatment. The Commission also cooperates with the police department to develop and include human rights courses in the police training curriculum.

The Commission holds public hearings to determine the status and treatment of racial, religious, and ethnic groups in the city and the best means to improve human relations. To lessen tensions and improve understanding in the community, the Commission initiates and facilitates discussions and negotiations between individuals and groups. When needed to carry out specific programs, the Commission aids in the creation of local community groups. The Commission conducts educational programs to promote equal treatment, opportunity, and understanding. The Commission also sponsors meetings and courses of instruction to help solve human relations problems.

Enforcement authority 
The Commission assists in the enforcement of all laws prohibiting discrimination against persons where jurisdiction is not specifically vested in another agency. In addition to this general enforcement authority, the Commission is authorized to enforce certain city, Texas, and United States laws prohibiting discrimination in employment, housing, and public accommodation. This includes the protection of persons who have Acquired Immune Deficiency Syndrome (AIDS) or who are infected with Human Immunodeficiency Virus (HIV) and any person who associates with them.

Protecting individuals against unlawful employment discrimination 
The Austin City Council has authorized the Commission to enforce certain laws that protect individuals from difference in treatment in their employment because of their race, color, religion, sex, national origin, age (40 years or older), disability, sexual orientation, or gender identity. Those laws are Title VII of the Civil Rights Act of 1964, the Age Discrimination in Employment Act of 1967, the Americans with Disabilities Act of 1990, Chapter 21 of the Texas Labor Code, and the city's employment ordinance (#750710-A). There are very important deadlines associated with the processing of employment discrimination complaints that can be found at the employment ordinance website.

The Austin City Council also has authorized the Commission to enforce the city's ordinance that prohibits employment discrimination by city contractors. This ordinance applies to any person who submits a bid or proposal to provide labor, goods, or services to the city by contract for profit. The ordinance also applies to any person who provides labor, goods, or services to the city by contract for profit. A subcontractor under such a contract is also covered by the ordinance. A person or subcontractor covered by the ordinance may not engage in a discriminatory employment practice. That means discrimination against an individual because of race, creed, color, religion, national origin, sexual orientation, gender identity, disability, sex, or age, unless sex or age is a bona fide occupational qualification of employment.

Protecting individuals against unlawful housing discrimination 
The Austin City Council has authorized the Commission to enforce the City of Austin's housing ordinance (#940210-A), which operates in conjunction with the federal Fair Housing Act of 1968 and the Texas Fair Housing Act. Those laws protect individuals against discrimination concerning the terms and conditions, rental, leasing, buying, or selling of housing based on their race, color, creed, religion, sex, national origin, disability, student status, marital status, familial status, sexual orientation, gender identity, or age (18 years or older). Important information about the ordinance can be found at the fair housing ordinance website.

Protecting individuals against unlawful discrimination in public accommodations 
The Austin City Council has authorized the Commission to enforce the City of Austin's public accommodations ordinance (#800522-I), which makes it unlawful for any public accommodation to deny access to goods, services, facilities, privileges, advantages, and accommodations to anyone based on race, color, religion, sex, sexual orientation, gender identity, national origin, age (18 years or older), or disability. Virtually all businesses are covered by this ordinance.

Protecting individuals living with HIV or AIDS against discrimination 
The Austin City Council has authorized the Commission to enforce the City of Austin's HIV/AIDS ordinance (#861211-V), which was adopted in 1986. The ordinance protects individuals who have AIDS, who are infected with HIV, who are perceived to have AIDS or be infected with HIV, or who are perceived to be a risk for any of these conditions. Also protected are individuals who associate with the individuals described above. Those individuals are protected from discrimination in employment, housing, city facilities and services, and public accommodations, including business establishments.

Protecting individuals living with disabilities against discrimination by the city or its contractors 
The Austin City Council has authorized the Commission to enforce the City of Austin's general ordinance that protects people living with disabilities from discrimination. The ordinance reflects the city's policy that no qualified person living with a disability may, on the basis of the disability, be subjected to discrimination under any program or activity operated by or contracted for by the city. This ordinance applies to both the city and its contractors.

References 

Organizations based in Austin, Texas
Organizations established in 1967